Kids & Teens TV (KTV, and also abbreviated as KT&TV) was an American Christian children's television channel operated by the Dominion Foundation, a non-profit organization founded by Sky Angel's founder Robert W. Johnson. It was originally carried exclusively by Dish Network as part of Sky Angel's slate of services on the provider. The channel primarily carried a mixture of evangelical programming, children's Christian programming, and secular classic series (particularly westerns).

In October 2015, TBN's children's television service Smile of a Child announced that it had reached a deal to simulcast its programming on KTV from 7:00 a.m. to 7:00 p.m. ET effective October 26, 2015.  This partnership ended on June 30, 2017.

On January 31, 2019, KTV, Angel One, and Angel Two shut down without warning and were pulled off the air after Sky Angel ceased operations.

References 

Evangelical television networks
Religious television stations in the United States
Television channels and stations established in 1999
Television channels and stations disestablished in 2019
Defunct television networks in the United States
1999 establishments in Florida